Ethel Mary Elderton (1878–1954) was a British eugenics researcher who worked with Francis Galton and Karl Pearson.

Biography
Elderton was born on 31 December 1878 in Fulham, London. Her father, William Alexander Elderton was a private tutor and her mother, Sarah Isabella, née Lapidge was school headmistress. The couple had eight children, of which Elderton was the third and the eldest girl. Her eldest brother was William Palin Elderton, a statistician who worked as an actuary and became head of Equitable Life Assurance Society.

Elderton was educated at Streatham High School before studying at Bedford College in London. There she was taught by Alice Lee, who was also employed by biostatistician Karl Pearson, and became involved in the eugenics movement. She left without completing her studies in 1890, on the death of her father, and became a school teacher. In 1905 she resigned her teaching post to become Francis Galton's assistant. Subsequently she became Galton Scholar and Fellow and Assistant Professor at University College London. She retired in 1933, and died on 5 May 1954 having never married.

Writings
Elderton produced many reports, the most controversial of which argued that predisposition to alcoholism was largely inherited. She wrote Primer of Statistics in 1909 with her brother William Palin Elderton, who had also worked for Pearson. She also wrote The Relative Strength of Nurture and Nature that same year.

In 1910, she published two studies A First Study of the Influence of Parental Alcoholism on the Physique and Ability of the Offspring and A Second Study of the Influence of Parental Alcoholism on the Physique and Ability of the Offspring. Then in 1914 she published a Report on the English Birthrate, Part I: England North of the Humber. Elderton helped edit Pearson's 1925 work Annals of Eugenics.

References

Further reading
 R. Love (1979) Alice in Eugenics Land: Feminism and Eugenics in the Scientific Careers of Alice Lee and Ethel Elderton, Annals of Science, 36, 145-158.

English statisticians
1878 births
1954 deaths
Women statisticians